Manihatty, also known as B.Manihatty, is a village in the Nilgiris District of Tamil Nadu, India. Manihatty is 16 km to the south west of Ooty, the district capital of the Nilgiris. The residents of the village are predominantly part of the Badaga people, an ethnolinguistic community in the Nilgiris district. Tensions have arisen between Badaga and non-Badaga residents over representation of Badaga culture, i.e. when non-Badaga actors from Manihatty portrayed Badaga culture in the Tamil movie Azhagai Irukkirai Bayamai Irukkirathu. 

The village of Manihatty consists of two smaller hamlets: Kunna Hatty (Meaning "small village" in the Badaga language) and Dodda Hatty ("big village"). Kunna Hatty is the ooru, the primary village, supposedly built by the ancestors, while Dodda Hatty is an offshoot from Kunna Hatty. Over the years, Dodda Hatty has grown considerably in terms of the number of households and relative population. At present, Kunna Hatty has about 100 households and Dodda Hatty about 350 households.

Economy
The economy of Manihatty is dependent on agriculture and tea plantations.

Culture
Jangura Habba (Sacred Thread Festival) is the main festival of Manihatty. During this festival, people pray to Shiva, one of the principal deities of Hinduism.

In 2012, L. Moorthy, a resident of Manihatty, proposed constructing a church in Manihatty. This was widely condemned as denigrating Badaga culture and threatening the unity of the village. Protests against the church were attended by hundreds of people, including prominent community leaders, during which Moorthy's house was attacked. During the protest, 18 people were arrested by the police. Protestors demanded the unconditional release of those arrested, that authorities block the building of the church, and take 'suitable actions' against those who denigrated Badaga culture.

References 

Villages in Nilgiris district